Coleophora impalella is a moth of the family Coleophoridae. It is found in Hungary and southern Russia (Middle and Lower Volga).

The larvae possibly feed on Aster species.

References

impalella
Moths described in 1961
Moths of Europe